Annie Morgan Suganami (born 1952) is an artist and musician who trained at the Royal Academy of Music and Cardiff School of Art & Design and now lives and works in Machynlleth, Wales.

Work 

Suganami's paintings "of vivacity and originality," have included portraits of Welsh poet Menna Elfyn and the Welsh writer Jan Morris. Suganami is "compelled to paint characters emanating tenacity, perseverance, resistance and tenderness – personal icons of endurance in uncertain times." She has exhibited work at the National Eisteddfod of Wales in Anglesey, the 2014 Beep Painting Biennial, and at MOMA Wales in Machynlleth. She was artist in residence at Oriel Brondanw in 2018.

As a member of Welsh music group Cusan Tan, Suganami recorded the album Cusan Tan on Wales’ Fflach label, which was released in the U.S. in 1994 by Firebird Music of Portland. Sain Recordings released the album Yr Esgair in 2000.

References

1952 births
Living people
20th-century Welsh women artists
21st-century Welsh women artists
Welsh folk singers
Welsh women painters
Women flautists
People from Machynlleth